Al-Rawdhatain Sport Club, is an Iraqi football team based in Karbala, that plays in the Iraq Division Three.

Managerial history
 Salem Odah
 Alaa Mohammed Salih

See also 
 2019–20 Iraq FA Cup

References

External links
 Al-Rawdhatain SC on Goalzz.com
 Iraq Clubs- Foundation Dates

2001 establishments in Iraq
Association football clubs established in 2001
Football clubs in Karbala